Forever is an album by English new-age musician Phil Sawyer, working together with the Malcolm Sargent Festival Choir under the artistic name Beautiful World.

Track listing
 Pepo Iko 1 – 5:12
 Children of the Future 1 – 4:38
 Eternally 1 – 5:41
 Fearless ² – 4:37
 Love Is Everything 1 – 4:57
 Pana Kama Dunia 1 – 5:22
 Oh Beautiful Paradise 1 – 5:23
 Forever ² – 4:44
 Hell Bent on Misery ² – 4:23
 I'll Be There ² – 4:16
 Africa ² – 5:09
 The Healing ³ – 8:04
1 lyrics in Swahili
2 lyrics in English
3 instrumental

Production
Producer: Phil Sawyer
Programmer: Andy Gray
Publisher: Accorder Music Publishing

Phil Sawyer albums
1996 albums